Bythiospeum tschapecki is a species of very small freshwater snails that have an operculum, aquatic gastropod mollusks in the family Hydrobiidae.

This species is endemic to Austria, and commemorates Hippolyt Tschapeck (1825–1897), an Austrian malacologist.

References

Hydrobiidae
Bythiospeum
Endemic fauna of Austria
Gastropods described in 1882
Taxonomy articles created by Polbot